Nadine Thomas (born May 14, 1952) is an American politician who served in the Georgia House of Representatives from the 55th district from 1991 to 1993 and the first African American Female to serve in the Georgia State Senate from the 10th district from 1993 to 2005.

References

1952 births
Living people
Democratic Party members of the Georgia House of Representatives
Democratic Party Georgia (U.S. state) state senators
African-American state legislators in Georgia (U.S. state)
21st-century African-American people
20th-century African-American people